Micheal O'Siadhail (born on 12 January, 1947) is an Irish poet. Among his awards are The Marten Toonder Prize and The Irish American Culture Institute Prize for Literature.

Early life

Micheal O'Siadhail was born into a middle-class Dublin family. His father, a chartered accountant, was born in County Monaghan and worked most of his life in Dublin, and his mother was a Dubliner with roots in County Tipperary. Both of them are portrayed in his work in several poems such as "Kinsmen" and "Promise".
From the age of twelve, O'Siadhail was educated at the Jesuit boarding school Clongowes Wood College, an experience he was later to describe in a sequence of poems "Departure" (The Chosen Garden). At Clongowes he was influenced by his English teacher, the writer Tom McIntyre, who introduced him to contemporary poetry. At thirteen he first visited the Aran Islands. This pre-industrial society with its large-scale emigration had a profound impact on him. His earlier work reflects this tension between his love of his native Dublin and his emotional involvement with those outlying communities and which features in the sequence "Fists of Stone" (The Chosen Garden).

Career

Micheal O'Siadhail studied at Trinity College Dublin (1964–68) where his teachers included David H. Greene and Máirtín Ó Cadhain. He was elected a Scholar of the College and took a First Class Honours Degree. His circle in Trinity included David McConnell (later professor of genetics), Mary Robinson and David F. Ford (later Regius Professor of Divinity at Cambridge University). O'Siadhail subsequently embarked on a government exchange scholarship and studied folklore and Icelandic at the University of Oslo. He has retained lifelong contacts with Norwegian friends and sees Scandinavian literature as a major influence.

In 1970 he married Bríd Ní Chearbhaill, who was born in Gweedore in County Donegal. She was for most of her life a teacher and later headmistress in an inner-city Dublin primary school until her retirement in 1995 due to Parkinson's disease. She has been a central figure in O'Siadhail's oeuvre, celebrated in the sequence "Rerooting" in The Chosen Garden and in Love Life, which is a meditation on their lifelong relationship. One Crimson Thread travels with the progression of Bríd's Parkinson's Disease. Bríd died on 17 June 2013.

For seventeen years, O'Siadhail earned his living as an academic; firstly as a lecturer at Trinity College (1969–73) where he was awarded an MLitt in 1971, and then as a research professor at the Dublin Institute for Advanced Studies. During these years he gave named lectures in Dublin and at Harvard University and Yale University and was a visiting professor at the University of Iceland in 1982. In 1987 he resigned his professorship to devote himself to writing poetry which he described as "a quantum leap".

He served as a member of the Arts Council of the Republic of Ireland (1987–93), of the Advisory Committee on Cultural Relations (1989–97), and was editor of Poetry Ireland Review. He was the founding chairman of ILE (Ireland Literature Exchange). As a founder member of Aosdána (Academy of Distinguished Irish Artists) he is part of a circle of artists and has worked with his friend, the composer Seóirse Bodley, the painters Cecil King and Mick O'Dea, and in 2008 he gave a reading as part of Brian Friel's eightieth birthday celebration. 

He represented Ireland at the Poetry Society's European Poetry Festival in London in 1981 and at the Frankfurt Book Fair in 1997. He was writer-in-residence at the Yeats Summer School in 1991 and writer-in-residence at the University of British Columbia in 2002.

He is now married to Christina Weltz, who is a native of New York, and assistant professor of surgical oncology at Mount Sinai. They reside in New York.

In 2018, Micheal was included in The Tablet magazine's ′Fifty Minds That Matter′ – fifty men and women who are ″adding some Catholic salt to the contemporary cultural soup″. Included on this list is Pope Francis, Martin Scorsese and Bruce Springsteen.

During his years as an academic, O'Siadhail, writing under the Irish spelling of his name, published works on the linguistics of Irish and a textbook for learners of Irish.

Content and context

David F. Ford points out in Musics of Belonging (Carysfort Press, Dublin 2007) how "beside the new architectonics since the move to full-time writing there has also been an alternation between more personal and more public themes". 

Ford lists the characteristic themes in O'Siadhail's work which emerge from early on as: "despair, women, love, friendship, trust, language, school, vocation, music city life, science, Irish and other cultures and histories". He adds that "there is a wrestling for meaning, with no easy solutions – both the form and the content are hard-won". Several critics have highlighted how O'Siadhail uses a vast variety of classic forms including sonnets, terza rima, villanelles, haikus etc. alongside an array of new intricate forms as befits his themes.

His work has been compared by some commentators to Dante, John Milton and Patrick Kavanagh but most often to John Donne. Recent criticism has drawn attention to the depth and range of his intellectual engagements. Mary O'Donnell traced the influence of the philosopher Emmanuel Levinas in A Fragile City and the academic and critic Eugene O'Brien, editor of The Irish Book Review, described his work as "that rare combination of the intellectual and the emotional".

Development
The trajectory in O'Siadhail's work first moves beyond the sense of despair which haunted his youth, through the collections of once-off poems into the architectonics of his larger thematic books.

In 1978, O'Siadhail published his first poetry collection The Leap Year (originally written in Irish), which was a meditation on healing and nature set against an urban background. This was followed in 1980 by Rungs of Time (originally in Irish) which in an almost Edda-like style announced many of the characteristic themes that would dominate his work; and in 1982 Belonging (the last of this trio originally written in Irish) emphasised, by its title, relationships as a major theme. There were two more collections which contain a few of his best known poems, Springnight in 1983 and The Image Wheel in 1985, before he went full-time and began a series of books based on broad themes.

The Chosen Garden, which appeared in 1990, he himself described as "an effort to face my own journey, to comprehend and trace one's own tiny epic". In 1992 he published Hail! Madam Jazz: New and Selected Poems which includes the new sequence The Middle Voice. In 1995 came A Fragile City, which is a meditation in four parts on the theme of trust. Our Double Time, published three years later in 1998, explores the liberation of facing human finitude in a way that allows a greater intensity of living. Then in 2002 The Gossamer Wall was published. It evokes the Holocaust from its origins to its aftermath in a book-length sequence of stark intensity and was shortlisted for the Jewish Quarterly-Wingate Literary Prize. In Love Life in 2005, O'Siadhail reflects on and rejoices in a long marriage. This was followed in 2007 by Globe, which ponders the dynamics of history in a fast-changing world, its tragedies and achievements as well as its potential.

Bibliography

Books
Poetry
1978: The Leap Year/An Bhliain Bhisigh (An Clóchomar, Dublin )
1980: Rungs of Time/Runga (An Clóchomhar, Dublin )
1982: Belonging/Cumann (An Clóchomhar, Dublin)
1985: Springnight (Bluett, Dublin)
1990: The Image Wheel (Bluett, Dublin)
1990: The Chosen Garden (Dedalus, Dublin)
1992: Hail! Madam Jazz : New and Selected Poems including The Middle Voice (Bloodaxe, Newcastle upon Tyne)
1995: A Fragile City (Bloodaxe, Newcastle upon Tyne 1995)
1998: Our Double Time (Bloodaxe, Newcastle, upon Tyne)
1999: Poems 1975–1995 (Bloodaxe, Newcastle upon Tyne)
2002: The Gossamer Wall (Time Being Books (North American publisher) and Bloodaxe, Tarset)
2005: Love Life (Bloodaxe, Tarset)
2007: Globe (Bloodaxe, Tarset)
2010: Tongues  (Bloodaxe, Tarset)
2014: Collected Poems (Bloodaxe, Tarset)
2015: One Crimson Thread (Bloodaxe, Tarset; Baylor University Press in US)
2018: The Five Quintets (Baylor University Press, US)

Linguistics and language pedagogy
1978: Téarmaí tógálá agus tís as Inis Meáin (Dublin Institute for Advanced Studies)
1983: (with Arndt Wigger) Córas Fuaimeanna na Gaeilge (Dublin Institute for Advanced Studies)
1988: Learning Irish (Yale University Press)
1989: Modern Irish: Grammatical Structure and Dialectal Variation (Cambridge University Press)

Limited editions

1989 Four Poems (with artist Cecil King) Editions Monica Beck

About O'Siadhail and his work

2007: The Musics of Belonging: The Poetry of Micheal O'Siadhail Ed. Marc Caball and David F. Ford, Carysfort Press, Dublin
2008: A Hazardous Melody of Being: Seóirse Bodley's Song Cycles on the Poems of Micheal O'Siadhail Edited by Lorraine Byrne Bodley, Carysfort Press, Dublin
2009: An Unexpected Light: Theology and Witness in the Poetry and Though of Charles Williams, Micheal O'Siadhail and Geoffrey Hill, David C. Mahan, Pickwick Publications Eugene

Works set to music

1987: The Naked Flame, poem suite (music: Seóirse Bodley) RTÉ commissioned for performance and broadcasting
1993: Summerfest poem suite (Music: Colman Pearce) RTÉ commissioned for performance and broadcasting
2000: Earlsfort Suite song cycle (Music: Seóirse Bodley) commissioned for Irish Government Department of Arts, the Gaeltacht, Heritage and the Islands as part of the Millennium Frozen Music celebration
2000: A Fall set by Dan Tucker, commissioned by the Chicago Humanities Festival,
2002: Dublin Spring, poem suite (music: James Wilson) commissioned for performance.
2006: Twee gedichten van Micheal O'Siadhail for Choir 2006 by Kees van Ersel
2007: Squall set by Seóirse Bodley

Discography

The Naked Flame, poem suite (music: Seóirse Bodley) recorded by Aylish E. Kerrigan accompanied on piano by the composer Seóirse Bodley and available from Ein Klang, Christophestaße, Stuttgart 70178
Cosmos from Hail! Madam Jazz recorded by Helen Shapiro on Jazz Poetry ABM

References

External links
 Personal homepage
 Page at Bloodaxe Books
 Page at Timebeing
 Page at Aosdána

Academics of the Dublin Institute for Advanced Studies
Irish poets
1947 births
Living people
People educated at Clongowes Wood College
Alumni of Trinity College Dublin
Scholars of Trinity College Dublin
21st-century Irish poets